Eat Already? 3 is a Singaporean Hokkien-language drama series which is telecast on Singapore's free-to-air channel, Mediacorp Channel 8. It stars Chen Shucheng , Hong Huifang , Felicia Chin , Nick Shen , Rayson Tan , Lin Meijiao , Zheng Geping , Marcus Chin & Sora Ma as the casts of the third installment with a special appearance Amy Khor.

Plot
Eat Already? 3 tells the story of everyday Singaporeans, no matter their age and level of experience, adapting and adjusting themselves to keep up with technology.

Cast

Yuan Family

Wang Family

Zeng Family

Other cast

Cameo appearance

Development
The series is a collaboration between the Ministry of Communications and Information (MCI) and Mediacorp, in partnership with Boku Films and Tribal Worldwide.

Music

Trivia 
 On 1 August 2017, a promotional roadshow was held at Central Stage @ Ang Mo Kio Town Centre with artistes Felicia Chin, Chen Shucheng, Lin Meijiao, Marcus Chin, Rayson Tan, Zheng Geping, Nick Shen and Zheng Wanling and special guests Liu Lingling, Ms Mole and CKay.
This will be Marcus Chin's third season after Eat Already? & Eat Already? 2.
A special, Making of Eat Already? 3, aired on 11 August 2017.
 Two special episodes, The Best Of Eat Already? 3, will be aired on 27 October 2017 and 2 November 2017 from 12pm to 12.30pm.

References

Singaporean television series
2017 Singaporean television seasons